The Malayan roundleaf bat (Hipposideros nequam) is a horseshoe bat found only in Malaysia. It is listed as a data deficient species.

Taxonomy
It was described as a new species in 1918 by Danish mammalogist Knud Andersen. The holotype had been collected in 1879 by W. Davison in Klang, Malaysia. It was presented to Andersen by Allan Octavian Hume.
It is considered a member of the bicolor species group within Hipposideros based on its morphology. The holotype is the only known specimen of this species. As it was damaged, it is uncertain if the Malayan roundleaf bat is truly a distinct species. Its species name "nequam" is Latin for "worthless."

Description
Its first premolar is small and its nasal septum is very thin.

Range and status
The Malayan roundleaf bat is only known from the type locality of Klang, Malaysia. As of 2016, it was evaluated as a data deficient species by the IUCN.

References

Endemic fauna of Malaysia
Mammals described in 1918
Bats of Malaysia
Hipposideros
Taxa named by Knud Andersen